Gillis Gillisz. de Bergh (1600 in Delft – 1669 in Delft), was a Dutch Golden Age painter.

According to the RKD, he was a still life painter influenced by Cornelis Jacobsz Delff, who became a member of the Delft Guild of St. Luke in 1624.

References

Gillis Gillisz. de Bergh on Artnet

External links
Vermeer and The Delft School, a full-text exhibition catalog from The Metropolitan Museum of Art, which contains material on Gillis Gillisz. de Bergh

1600 births
1669 deaths
Dutch Golden Age painters
Dutch male painters
Artists from Delft
Painters from Delft
Dutch still life painters